Samarkandek is a village in Batken Region of Kyrgyzstan. It is the seat of the Samarkandek rural community (ayyl aymagy) within the Batken District. Its population was 8,015 in 2021.

Until 2013, the strategic road Batken-Isfana passed through Samarkandek. In 2013, ethnic conflict between enclave of Tajikistan, Vorukh and Samarkandyk led to mutual closing of borders. As Batken-Isfana road passed through Voruh also, government officials started to build a detouring road which would lay entirely in Kyrgyzstan borders. This latter event left Samarkandyk off the road.

Population

References

Populated places in Batken Region